M. Patricia Adamski is an American legal scholar and Adolph J. and Dorothy R. Eckhardt Distinguished Professor of Corporate Law at Hofstra University.

References

Living people
American legal scholars
Hofstra University faculty
Year of birth missing (living people)